Harden Street Substation, also known as Harden Street Fire Station, is a historic fire station located at Columbia, South Carolina. It was built in 1953, and is a two-story, rectangular brick building with a flat roof constructed in the Moderne style.  It was built by the city of Columbia to house African-American firemen under white officers and maintain institutional segregation.

It was added to the National Register of Historic Places in 2005.

References

African-American history of South Carolina
Government buildings on the National Register of Historic Places in South Carolina
Moderne architecture in South Carolina
Government buildings completed in 1953
Buildings and structures in Columbia, South Carolina
National Register of Historic Places in Columbia, South Carolina